KHET (channel 11), branded as PBS Hawai'i, is a PBS member television station in Honolulu, Hawaii, United States, serving the Hawaiian Islands. Owned by the Hawaii Public Television Foundation, the station maintains studios on Sand Island Access Road in Honolulu, and its main transmitter is located on Palehua Ridge, north of Makakilo.

The station's signal is relayed across the rest of the state outside Oahu and metropolitan Honolulu on full-powered satellite KMEB (virtual and VHF digital channel 10) in Wailuku on Maui (with transmitter at Ulupalakua) and through a network of low-powered translators on the other Hawaiian Islands.

Station history

KHET signed on the air for the first time on April 15, 1966; KMEB followed on six months later on September 22 of that year. KHET is the second outlet in Honolulu to occupy the channel 11 dial position, the first being KONA-TV from 1952 to 1955, when it moved to channel 2 because the higher VHFs (2 to 6) offered more ERPs at the time; that station is now KHON-TV. Had KONA not moved to channel 2, the channel would have remained a commercial allocation, as the FCC had intended to make channel 7 a non-commercial allocation for Honolulu in the first assignment, but the FCC relocated channel 7 to Wailuku in 1959 and made channel 11 a non-commercial allocation instead (the Wailuku allocation was intended to be on channel 8). Originally known on-air as "Hawaii Educational Television" (or "Hawaii ETV"), it rebranded as "Hawaii Public Television" in 1970 and then became "PBS Hawai'i" in 2003.

PBS Hawaii had remained one of the few remaining American television stations that continued to sign off during the overnight hours, years after most PBS member stations had transitioned to a 24-hour schedule; until July 14, 2019, its over-the-air broadcast signals transmitted from 5:00 a.m. to 12:00 a.m. daily, although beginning in 2001, PBS Hawaii maintained a separate 24-hour-a-day cable feed containing programming from the PBS Satellite Service during the over-the-air signals’ overnight dark period (from midnight–5:00 a.m.). On July 15, 2019, coinciding with the launch of its DT3 subchannel (affiliated with PBS Kids 24/7), PBS Hawaii adopted a 24-hour schedule on its broadcast feed: on that date, the member network’s main channel added PBS Satellite Service overnight programming and its DT2 subchannel began offering an expanded schedule of PBS Kids programming in the former downtime.

Original materials from PBS Hawaii have also been contributed to the American Archive of Public Broadcasting.

Technical information

Subchannels
The stations' digital signals are multiplexed:

Analog-to-digital conversion
Both stations discontinued regular programming on their analog signals, respectively on January 15, 2009, the date in which full-power television stations in Hawai'i transitioned from analog to digital broadcasts (almost five months earlier than the June 12 transition date for stations on the U.S. mainland):
 KHET discontinued regular programming on its analog signal, over VHF channel 11; the station's digital signal relocated from its pre-transition UHF channel 18 to VHF channel 11.
 KMEB discontinued regular programming on its analog signal, over VHF channel 10; the station's digital signal relocated from its pre-transition UHF channel 30 to VHF channel 10.

The station's digital transmitter operates at 9.5 kW (versus 148 kW for its analog signal).

Translators
PBS Hawai'i operates the following low-powered translator stations:

References

External links

PBS Hawaii in the American Archive of Public Broadcasting

HET
PBS member stations
Television channels and stations established in 1966
1966 establishments in Hawaii